{{safesubst:#invoke:RfD||2=Mass, Sacrifice of the|month = March
|day =  7
|year = 2023
|time = 23:40
|timestamp = 20230307234058

|content=
REDIRECT Eucharist

}}